Senator Edwards may refer to:

Members of the United States Senate
Edward I. Edwards (1863–1931), U.S. Senator from New Jersey from 1923 to 1929
Elaine Edwards (1929–2018), U.S. Senator from Louisiana in 1972
John Edwards (Kentucky politician) (1748–1837), U.S. Senator from Kentucky
John Edwards (born 1953), U.S. Senator from North Carolina

United States state senate members
Chet Edwards (born 1951), Texas State Senate
Chris Edwards (Oregon politician) (born 1973), Oregon State Senate
Chuck Edwards (born 1960), North Carolina State Senate
Edwin Edwards (1927–2021), Louisiana State Senate
George C. Edwards (born 1948), Maryland State Senate
Henry W. Edwards (1779–1847), Connecticut State Senate
James B. Edwards (1927–2014), South Carolina State Senate
John S. Edwards (Virginia politician) (born 1943), Virginia State Senate
John Edwards (Arkansas politician) (1805–1894), Arkansas State Senate
L. K. Edwards Jr. (1917–1989), Florida State Senate
Lewis A. Edwards (1811–1879), New York State Senate
Martin Koons Edwards (1938–2017), Indiana State Senate
Ninian Wirt Edwards (1809–1889), Illinois State Senate
Ninian Edwards (1775–1833), Illinois State Senate
Ralph Edwards (politician) (fl. 1940s), Maine State Senate
Samuel L. Edwards (1789–1877), New York State Senate
Weldon Nathaniel Edwards (1788–1873), North Carolina State Senate
William Edwards (Wisconsin politician) (1861–1944), Wisconsin State Senate